Treynor is a city in Pottawattamie County, Iowa, United States. The population was 1,032 as of the 2020 census.

History

Treynor began east of Council Bluffs, IA in the late 1880s with the establishment of Fritz Eyberg's General Store, August Olderog's dance hall and saloon, and St Paul's German Evangelical Church. The vicinity east of Middle Silver Creek had previously been known for its number of wolves. Local German immigrant farmers referred to the settlement as Four Corners or High Five, a popular card name, until the post office opened in the early 1890s as Treynor, named after the recently deceased Council Bluffs postmaster. By the time the town was incorporated in 1905, it included two general stores, two saloons, a furniture/implement house, a livery stable, several blacksmith shops, and the Treynor State Bank. In 1911, the community got its own railroad with the opening of the Iowa & Omaha Shortline which ran 12 miles to Neoga, a small depot on the Wabash Railroad line southeast of Council Bluffs. The line was unprofitable and ended operations after five years. The Great Depression closed down the Treynor State Bank while improvements began on the "Short-line" Road from Treynor to Council Bluffs that is now Iowa Highway 92. An Air Force radar base operated just outside town during the early years of the Cold War.

Geography
Treynor is located at  (41.231042, −95.606648).

Demographics

2010 census
As of the census of 2010, there were 919 people, 363 households, and 269 families living in the city. The racial makeup of the city was 99.9% White and 0.1% African American. Hispanic or Latino of any race were 0.1% of the population.

There were 363 households, of which 35.8% had children under the age of 18 living with them, 64.2% were married couples living together, 7.7% had a female householder with no husband present, 2.2% had a male householder with no wife present, and 25.9% were non-families. 23.4% of all households were made up of individuals, and 10.8% had someone living alone who was 65 years of age or older. The average household size was 2.53 and the average family size was 3.01.

The median age in the city was 40.7 years. 26.4% of residents were under the age of 18; 6.2% were between the ages of 18 and 24; 23.8% were from 25 to 44; 28.2% were from 45 to 64; and 15.3% were 65 years of age or older. The gender makeup of the city was 48.6% male and 51.4% female.

2000 census
As of the census of 2000, there were 950 people, 362 households, and 274 families living in the city. The racial makeup of the city was 99.68% White, 0.11% African American and 0.21% Asian. Hispanic or Latino of any race were 0.11% of the population.

There were 362 households, out of which 37.0% had children under the age of 18 living with them, 63.5% were married couples living together, 8.8% had a female householder with no husband present, and 24.3% were non-families. 22.7% of all households were made up of individuals, and 14.6% had someone living alone who was 65 years of age or older. The average household size was 2.62 and the average family size was 3.08.

28.2% are under the age of 18, 5.9% from 18 to 24, 26.7% from 25 to 44, 23.7% from 45 to 64, and 15.5% who were 65 years of age or older. The median age was 39 years. For every 100 females, there were 98.7 males. For every 100 females age 18 and over, there were 96.0 males.

The median income for a household in the city was $56,696, and the median income for a family was $65,357. Males had a median income of $41,771 versus $25,577 for females. The per capita income for the city was $22,118. About 1.5% of families and 2.7% of the population were below the poverty line, including 0.7% of those under age 18 and 3.6% of those age 65 or over.

References

Cities in Pottawattamie County, Iowa
Cities in Iowa